Carroll Township is one of the twenty-one townships of Tama County, Iowa, United States.

History
Carroll Township was established in 1857.

References

Townships in Tama County, Iowa
Townships in Iowa
1857 establishments in Iowa
Populated places established in 1857